"Creep" is the fourth and final single by rap duo Mobb Deep, from their album Blood Money. The song features 50 Cent but the video accompanied with it was made and was not released. The B-side of the single is "It's Alright", featuring Mary J. Blige and 50 Cent.

Track listing

Side A
"Creep" (Clean Version)
"Creep" (Dirty Version)
"Creep" (Instrumental)

Side B
"It's Alright" (Clean Version)
"It's Alright" (Dirty Version)
"It's Alright" (Instrumental)

2006 singles
2006 songs
Mobb Deep songs
G-Unit Records singles
Interscope Records singles
Song recordings produced by Havoc (musician)
Songs written by 50 Cent
Songs written by Prodigy (rapper)
Songs written by Havoc (musician)